Eucalyptus hawkeri is a species of mallee or slender tree that is endemic to Victoria, Australia. It has rough, flaky or fibrous bark on the lower trunk, smooth bark above, lance-shaped or curved adult leaves, flower buds in groups of between seven and eleven, white flowers and cylindrical or barrel-shaped fruit.

Description
It has rough, scaly or fibrous bark on the lower half of its trunk, smooth light grey to brownish bark above. Flowering occurs in autumn and the flowers are white.

Taxonomy and naming
Eucalyptus hawkeri was first formally described in 2004 by Kevin Rule from a specimen collected on Mount Arapiles and the description was published in the journal Muelleria. The specific epithet honours the park ranger, Peter Hawker, for his contribution to the understanding of this species.

Distribution and habitat
This mallee is only known from the Mt. Arapiles area and nearby reserves where it grows in remnant woodland.

See also
List of Eucalyptus species

References

Flora of Victoria (Australia)
hawkeri
Myrtales of Australia
Plants described in 2004